Mírzá Muhammad ʻAlí (  1853–1937) was one of the sons of Baháʼu'lláh, the founder of the Baháʼí Faith. He was the eldest son of his father's second wife, Fatimih Khanum, later known as Mahd-i-'Ulya, whom Baháʼu'lláh married in Tehran in 1849. Muhammad ʻAlí received the title from his father of G͟husn-i-Akbar ("Greatest Branch" or "Greater Branch").

Early years

Mírzá Muhammad ʻAlí was born on December 16, 1853, in Baghdad during Baháʼu'lláh's first year of exile in that city. In 1863, at the age of nine, he accompanied his family in their exile to Constantinople and Adrianople. During the final days in Adrianople, Mírzá Muhammad ʻAlí wrote about eighty letters to the believers of the Baháʼí Faith, such as those in Baghdad and its surrounding towns. He also asked permission of his father to travel abroad and spread the Baháʼí Faith.

Dispute with ʻAbdu'l-Bahá

In the Kitáb-i-ʻAhd ("Book of the Covenant"), Baháʼu'lláh appointed ʻAbdu'l-Bahá as his successor, with Muhammad ʻAli given a station "beneath" that of ʻAbdu'l-Bahá. Both were noted explicitly by their titles, with Muhammad Ali being called G͟husn-i-Akbar and ʻAbdu'l-Bahá being called G͟husn-i-Aʻzam. As time passed, Muhammad ʻAlí claimed that ʻAbdu'l-Bahá was not sharing power. According to some interpretations, Muhammad ʻAlí insisted that he should instead be regarded as the leader of the Baháʼís. Many accusations were leveled against each other by both ʻAbdu'l-Bahá and Muhammad ʻAlí, culminating in Muhammad ʻAlí's accusing his older brother of conspiring against the Ottoman government. This resulted in the imprisonment and near-death of ʻAbdu'l-Bahá and his family. Almost all Baháʼís accepted ʻAbdu'l-Bahá as Baháʼu'lláh's successor.

At the time of ʻAbdu'l-Bahá's death, Shoghi Effendi was appointed the Guardian of the Faith by ʻAbdu'l-Bahá in his Will and Testament, while Muhammad ʻAlí was reprimanded in the same document as "The Center of Sedition, the Prime Mover of mischief." Because Baháʼu'lláh's Kitáb-i-ʻAhd named Muhammad ʻAlí as "after" ʻAbdu'l-Bahá's, he took the opportunity of ʻAbdu'l-Bahá's death to try to revive his claim to leadership, but his attempt to occupy the Shrine of Baháʼu'lláh by force left him on the losing end of a legal battle that removed any rights he had to the property.

The division between rival sects with Mírzá Muhammad ʻAlí and Shoghi Effendi as their respective leaders was short-lived and Shoghi Effendi emerged as the leader of the global Baháʼí community, labeling Muhammad ʻAlí the arch-breaker of the Covenant of Baháʼu'lláh. Mírzá Muhammad ʻAlí would lead the small Unitarian Baha'i denomination. In 1904, he sent his oldest son, Shua Ullah Behai, to the United States where he led the Unitarian Baha'i community. From 1934 to 1937, Behai published Behai Quarterly, a "Unitarian" Baháʼí magazine written in English and featuring the writings of Mirza Muhammad ʻAlí and various other Unitarian Bahais, including Ibrahim George Kheiralla. This schism had very little effect overall. In the ʻAkká area, the followers of Muhammad ʻAlí represented six families at most, they had no common religious activities, and were almost wholly assimilated into Muslim society. This group essentially disappeared. A modern academic observer  has reported an ineffectual attempt to revive the claims of Muhammad Ali.

Death

Mirza Muhammad ʻAlí died on December 10, 1937, in the city of Haifa in the Mandate of Palestine. Memorial services were held at Haifa on Tuesday, January the 18th, 1938.

See also 
Baháʼu'lláh's family
Covenant-breaker
Baháʼí divisions

Notes and citations

Notes

Citations

References 

1853 births
1937 deaths
Bahá'í divisions
Family of Baháʼu'lláh
People from Baghdad